NEFERT (Neck Flexion Rotation Test) is a medical examination procedure developed in 1999 by German neurootologist Claus-Frenz Claussen.

Use 

The procedure serves for investigating intracorporal movement differences between head and body, especially at the atlanto-axial joint and the lower cervical spine column. The method can help diagnosing sprains of the neck, stiff necks, and whiplash. According to the National Center for Biotechnology Information within the National Institutes of Health, the procedure is "commonly used in clinical practice to evaluate patients with cervicogenic headache."

Method 

The test consists of six movements, which can also be distinguished into four phases. The movements are performed by the patient in a standing position.

 (Phase I) The patient turns his head several times maximally within a time period of 20 seconds.
 (Phase II) The patient bows his head forward maximally.
 In a bowed position, the patient turns his head maximally from the left to the right and from the right to the left within a time period of 20 seconds.
 (Phase III) The patient bows his head backwards maximally.
 In a position bowed backwards, the patient turns his head for several times maximally from the left to the right and from the right to the left within a time period of 20 seconds.
 (Phase IV) After a total time period of 60 seconds, the patient returns into a straight position.
 
If the test results are interfered by unconscious shoulder movements of the patient, a second test course is performed, during which the examining person holds the patient's shoulders with the hands. The test results are recorded and graphically evaluated by a computer, for example with the help of Cranio-corpography.

Literature 

 Claus-Frenz Claussen, Burkard Franz: Contemporary and Practical Neurootology, Neurootologisches Forschungsinstitut der 4-G-Forschung e. V., Bad Kissingen 2006,

References

External links 
 Claussen C. Neck Flexion, Extension, and Rotation Test. Int Tinnitus J. 2001;7(2):84-96

Medical tests